
The Battle of the Sarno (7 July 1460), also known as the Battle of Nola, was a decisive defeat of the forces of Ferdinand, king of Naples, by his dissatisfied barons supporting the claim of John of Anjou, duke of Lorraine. It was fought in the plain at the mouth of the Sarno River in Campania, south of Mount Vesuvius. John's forces were strengthened by reinforcements from Niccolò Piccinino, who on the 27th defeated papal and Milanese forces under Alessandro Sforza and Federigo of Urbino near San Fabiano.

Ferdinand escaped with only twenty men but, with the help of Pope Pius II, the duke of Milan, the Albanian lord Skanderbeg, and the king of Aragon, was ultimately able to defeat John at Troia on 18 August 1462 and off Ischia in 1465.

See also
 Battle of Nola (disambiguation)

References

Citations

References

 .
 
 

 .
 .
 .

Conflicts in 1460
Sarno 1460
1460 in Europe
15th century in the Kingdom of Naples